Irving Milton Adolphus (January 27, 1913 – August 16, 1988) was an American pianist and composer.

Biography 
Born in the Bronx, New York, and educated at Yale University, his classical compositions include over 200 orchestral, vocal and chamber works, among them 13 symphonies and 35 string quartets (including one unnumbered). In 1935 he moved to Philadelphia where he studied composition with Rosario Scalero. He was also a founding member of the American Composers Alliance (of which Aaron Copland was the first president); involved extensively with the Curtis Institute of Music; a board member of the League of Composers; Director of the Philadelphia Music Center and active in the US civil rights movement. He married Elena Watnik (1913–2005), and had a son, Stephen Harris Adolphus.

He was appointed director of the Philadelphia Music Center in 1936, and in 1938 moved to Harrisburg, Pennsylvania, where he worked for the Department of Labor and Industry of the Commonwealth of Pennsylvania until his retirement in West Harwich, where he organized the Chatham Unitarian Universalist Fellowship. He died in Harwich, Massachusetts, on August 16, 1988.

Jazz
During the 1920s and early 1930s, Adolphus played with many jazz bands and orchestras in the vaudeville circuit in New York's Catskill Mountains and in New York City, including Irving "Ving" Merlin, with whom he composed I Can't Believe It. in 1931. During the 1930s, he was an arranger for Glen Gray's Casa Loma Orchestra and arranged their theme song, "Smoke Rings".

The BMI Foundation distributes the Milton Adolphus Award, which is given every year at New York City's LaGuardia High School for Performing Arts to a student for excellence in jazz improvisation.

Compositions 

 Symphony No. 8, in B minor (1936)
 Adagio for solo violin, solo cello and sinfonietta, Op.42
 Birthday Suite for piano, Op.87
 Bitter Suite for oboe, 4 clarinets and strings, Op.98 (1955)
 Bouncettino for viola and, Op.78 (1944)
 Cape Cod Suite, Op.200
 David's Dream, Aberration for orchestra, Op.149
 Dream World for piano, Op.90
 Elegy, Op.46
 Elegy for clarinet, horn, violin, viola and cello, Op.81
 Faith, An Oratorio, Op.123
 Five Vignettes for Piano, Op.94
 Four Poems
 Improvisation for viola and piano, Op.61 (1937)
 Interlude for cello and chamber orchestra, Op.96
 Lilacs for medium voice with clarinet and piano, Op.95 (1982)
 "Opus 93" for clarinet and piano, Op.93
 "Opus 99" for flute (or clarinet) and piano, Op.99
 Petits Fours for cello and piano (1960)
 Prelude and Allegro for string orchestra, Op.51
 Septet, Op.39
 Septet in F minor for oboe (or flute), 3 violins, 2 violas, 1 cello, Op.39a
 Song of the aircraft warning corps (1943)
 String Octet No.2, Op.175
 String Quartet No.8 in E Minor, Op.41
 String Quartet No.10, Op.45
 String Quartet No.13, Op.63
 String Quartet No.14, Op.65
 String Quartet No.15, Op.67
 String Quartet No.16 "Indian", Op.69
 String Quartet No.17, Op.70
 String Quartet No.18, Op.72
 String Quartet No.20, Op.80
 String Quartet No.21 "In Ancient Style", Op.84
 String Quartet No.23, Op.91
 Suite for string orchestra
 Suite No.2 for orchestra
 Tribach for flute, clarinet and piano, Op.101
 Trio Prosaico for violin, horn and piano, Op.147
 Ulalume, Op.39b
 War Sketches
 Wind Quartet, Op.20

Recordings
Few Adolphus recordings are currently available; however, Adolphus/Pisk/Gerschefski/McBride, a Composers Recordings, Inc. album from 1965, recorded by the National Polish Radio Symphony Orchestra, was reissued in 2010 by New World Records, and contains Adolphus' Elegy'' (1936). Additionally, many scores can be ordered from the American Composers Alliance reprint service.

References

External links
 BMI Foundation

1913 births
1998 deaths
Musicians from the Bronx
Musicians from New York City
Curtis Institute of Music alumni
Yale University alumni
20th-century classical composers
American classical composers
Jazz-influenced classical composers
Vaudeville performers
Classical musicians from New York (state)